Anatoliy Burlin (born 19 January 1990) is a Ukrainian professional footballer who plays as a midfielder for LNZ Cherkasy in the Ukrainian Second League.

Burlin began his playing career with FC Dynamo Kyiv's third team. He joined different clubs from Ukrainian Second and First Leagues. In 2011, he signed a contract with FC Sevastopol in the Ukrainian First League. His contract was signed to 31 May 2014.

References

External links 
 
 

1990 births
Living people
Ukrainian footballers
FC Dynamo-3 Kyiv players
FC Arsenal-Kyivshchyna Bila Tserkva players
FC Lviv players
FC Sevastopol players
FC Tytan Armyansk players
FC Helios Kharkiv players
FC Stal Kamianske players
FC Desna Chernihiv players
NK Veres Rivne players
FC Cherkashchyna players
FC LNZ Cherkasy players
Association football midfielders
Ukraine youth international footballers
Ukrainian Premier League players
Ukrainian First League players
Ukrainian Second League players
Sportspeople from Kherson Oblast